The 2010 Liebherr World Team Table Tennis Championships was held at the Olympic Indoor Arena in Moscow, Russia from May 23 to May 30, 2010. This decision was announced in May 2007. It was the 50th edition to be contested.

Medal summary

Medal table

Events

Results

Men's team

Final

Place 1–12 bracket

Women's team

Final

Place 1–12 bracket

References 

ITTF website
Movies from competition

 
World Table Tennis Championships
International sports competitions hosted by Russia
World Team Table Tennis Championships
World Team Table Tennis Championships
Table tennis competitions in Russia
May 2010 sports events in Europe
Sports competitions in Moscow
2010 in Moscow